Abdou Nassirou Ouro-Akpo (born 5 June 1982) is a Togolese former international footballer who played  as a striker.

Career
Ouro-Akpo has played club football in Togo and Germany for Maranatha, Rot-Weiß Oberhausen, Germania Gladbeck, Schwarz-Weiß Essen, SC Westfalia Herne, SC Fortuna Köln, SV Schermbeck, TSV Marl-Hüls, DSC Wanne-Eickel and BW Oberhausen-Lirich.

He earned five international caps for Togo in 2003.

References

1982 births
Living people
Togolese footballers
Togo international footballers
Maranatha FC players
Rot-Weiß Oberhausen players
Germania Gladbeck players
Schwarz-Weiß Essen players
SC Westfalia Herne players
SC Fortuna Köln players
SV Schermbeck players
TSV Marl-Hüls players
DSC Wanne-Eickel players
2. Bundesliga players
Association football forwards
Togolese expatriate footballers
Togolese expatriate sportspeople in Germany
Expatriate footballers in Germany
21st-century Togolese people